Nitesh Gupta (born 12 May 1993) is an Indian cricketer. He made his List A debut on 24 September 2019, for Sikkim in the 2019–20 Vijay Hazare Trophy. He made his first-class debut on 19 January 2020, for Sikkim in the 2019–20 Ranji Trophy. He made his Twenty20 debut on 17 January 2021, for Sikkim in the 2020–21 Syed Mushtaq Ali Trophy.

References

External links
 

1993 births
Living people
Indian cricketers
Sikkim cricketers
Place of birth missing (living people)